Mario Miguel Guerrero Abud (born September 28, 1949) is a former Major League Baseball shortstop who played for four teams in an eight-year career from  to .

Career
After four plus seasons in their farm system, he was sent to the Boston Red Sox on June 30,  as the player to be named later in the deal that brought future Cy Young Award winner Sparky Lyle to the Yankees. Guerrero made the Red Sox out of spring training , and won the starting shortstop job over Rick Burleson the following Spring following Luis Aparicio's retirement.

During the off season, Guerrero was traded to the St. Louis Cardinals for pitcher Jim Willoughby. He split  between the Cardinals and their triple A affiliate, the Tulsa Oilers, batting .239 in 64 games at the major league level. He was assigned to Tulsa in  when he was traded to the California Angels for two minor leaguers.

He signed as a free agent with the San Francisco Giants after the  season, only to be sent to Oakland on April 7,  to complete a trade in which the Athletics also acquired Gary Thomasson, Gary Alexander, Dave Heaverlo, John Henry Johnson, Phil Huffman, Alan Wirth and $300,000 for Vida Blue just over three weeks earlier on March 15. He played three seasons in Oakland before his contract was purchased by the Seattle Mariners. He retired following his release from the Mariners in spring training . In , Guerrero played for the Winter Haven Super Sox of the Senior Professional Baseball Association. He batted .315 in 15 games.

Personal
His brother Epy Guerrero was a coach for the Toronto Blue Jays. While working as a buscón (headhunter) in the Dominican Republic, Guerrero sued Raúl Mondesí for 1% of his salary.  He ended up winning a $640,000 judgment.

References

External links

Mario Guerrero at Baseball Almanac

1949 births
Boston Red Sox players
California Angels players
Dominican Republic expatriate baseball players in the United States
Fort Lauderdale Yankees players
Kinston Eagles players

Living people
Louisville Colonels (minor league) players
Major League Baseball players from the Dominican Republic
Major League Baseball shortstops
Manchester Yankees players
Oakland Athletics players
St. Louis Cardinals players
Syracuse Chiefs players
Tulsa Oilers (baseball) players
Winter Haven Super Sox players